Federico Viviani may refer to:

 Federico Viviani (footballer, born 1981), Italian footballer
 Federico Viviani (footballer, born 1992), Italian footballer

See also
Viviani (surname)